Jung Seung-hye (March 1965 – 17 May 2009) was a South Korean film producer.

Jung began her career as a film promoter for Shin Cine in 1989, working on the film Happiness Does Not Come From Grades. She later moved to Cine World where she produced a number of films, including Anarchists (2000) and Once Upon a Time in a Battlefield (2003). Following the commercial success of King and the Clown in 2005, Jung founded her own company, Achim Pictures, and produced films such as Radio Star (2006), Shadows in the Palace (2007) and Sunny (2008). In 2006 she was honored with the annual Women in Film Award by the Women in Film Korea organization.

In addition to her production work, Jung was a film columnist and worked as a copywriter on a number of domestic and foreign film productions. She was the author of several books, including Jung Seung-hye's Cartoon Theater and Jung Seung-hye's Lion's Cage.

Jung died from colon cancer on 17 May 2009, aged 44. She had been suffering from the illness since 2006, and was hospitalized a month prior to her death after the cancer spread to her lungs.

References

External links 
 

1965 births
2009 deaths
Deaths from colorectal cancer
South Korean film producers
South Korean women film producers